Robert Matthew Cook is a Magistrate of the Australian Capital Territory. He was appointed as a magistrate on 11 September 2013.

Career 
Cook first held positions as a dry-cleaner, waiter, barman and paperboy.

Cook then enlisted in the Royal Australian Air Force in 1976. He studied at the Queensland University of Technology while serving and eventually worked as a legal officer.

In 1996, Cook left the Royal Australian Air Force and became a solicitor in private practice. During this time, he was also the Vice-President of the Australian Industrial Relations Tribunal. From 2005 to 2010, he was also Deputy President of the ACT Racing Appeals Tribunal. He eventually became a partner in two separate major law firms.

He was called to the bar in 2010. He specialised in employment law as well as work, health and safety law.

The Attorney-General Simon Corbell announced in August 2013 that Cook would be appointed to the bench. He was formally appointed on 11 September 2013.

Personal life 
Cook is an active member of the rowing community in the ACT.

References 

Magistrates of the Magistrates Court of the Australian Capital Territory
Living people
Year of birth missing (living people)
Australian magistrates